Wallowitch & Ross: This Moment is a 1998 documentary musical film directed by Richard Morris. The film follows acclaimed composer and cabaret performer John Wallowitch and partner Bertram Ross, Martha Graham's lead dancer and co-director of the Graham Company. The film was shortlisted for the 1999 Academy Award for Best Documentary Feature.

Development
Wallowitch & Ross: This Moment was produced by Karmic Release Ltd. when costume designer Sue Gandy, a student of Wallowitch's introduced the duo to sister-in-law documentarian Roberta Morris Purdee and husband, actor Nathan Purdee. Filmed and edited in the first half of 1998 the film had its world premiere at the 1998 Palm Springs International Film Festival.

Reception
The film received overwhelmingly positive reviews going on to be shortlisted for the 1999 Academy Awards. Variety called the film "An exceptionally tender portrait...A throwback to the era of Gershwin, Berlin and Porter." While The New York Times reviewed it as "as much a story of true love as it is a true showbiz story...Hilarious...Outrageous...Sublime!"

Scandal
The 1998 Awards Season was marred by a number a of problematic screenings wherein documentary films already disqualified from consideration were screened for Academy Members in place of works still in contention.

Music
The film's soundtrack was released by Karmic Release Ltd along with the film and features performances by Wallowitch, Ross, Dixie Carter, Lynn Lobban, and Sue Gandy.

Legacy
The film has been preserved in both the UCLA and Academy of Motion Pictures Arts and Sciences archives for both its contribution to documentary cinema and LGBTQ representation.

References

External links
 

1990s English-language films
1998 documentary films
1998 musical films
American documentary films
American musical films
1990s American films